Suicide Squad: The Album is the soundtrack album to the film of the same name. It was released on August 5, 2016, by Atlantic Records and WaterTower Music. A separate film score album, titled Suicide Squad: Original Motion Picture Score and composed by Steven Price, was released on August 8, by WaterTower Music. The digital edition of the film score album contains eight bonus tracks. It received mixed reviews by critics, but the Collector's Edition received a Grammy Award nomination for Best Compilation Soundtrack for Visual Media at the 2017 ceremony. It won the 2017 Kids' Choice Awards for Favorite Soundtrack.

Track listing

Commercial performance 
In the United States, the soundtrack debuted at number one on the Billboard 200, with 182,000 equivalent album units. It  was also the best-selling album of the week, selling 128,000 copies in its first week on the chart.

Suicide Squad was certified gold in the United States on September 23, 2016, for 500,000 units composed by sales, streaming and track-equivalent units. It was certified platinum for shipping over 1 million equivalent-units on November 16. As of April 2017, it has sold 548,000 copies in the country.

Charts

Weekly charts

Year-end charts

Decade-end charts

Certifications

Suicide Squad: Original Motion Picture Score

Track listing

References

External links
 Official site (soundtrack)
 Official site (score)

2016 soundtrack albums
2010s film soundtrack albums
Atlantic Records soundtracks
DC Extended Universe soundtracks
Film scores
Soundtrack
WaterTower Music soundtracks
Albums produced by Jason Evigan
Albums produced by Alex da Kid
Albums produced by Mike Elizondo
Albums produced by Mark Ronson
Albums produced by Quincy Jones
Albums produced by Eminem
Albums produced by Butch Walker
Albums produced by John Fogerty
Albums produced by Erik Jacobsen
Superhero film soundtracks
Hip hop soundtracks
Rock soundtracks
Indie rock albums